Senderk District is a district (bakhsh) in Minab County, Hormozgan Province, Iran. At the 2006 census, its population was 19,501, in 4,191 families.  The District has one city: Senderk. The District has three rural districts (dehestan): Bondar Rural District, Dar Pahn Rural District, and Senderk Rural District.

References 

Districts of Hormozgan Province
Minab County